Paramount Chief Tuli Leiato (November 17, 1917 – October 5, 1983) of Fagaitua, was an American Fa'amatai leader and politician on the Islands of Tutuila, and Aunu'u in American Samoa. In addition to his Fa'a Samoa title he was sworn in on June 21, 1963, as the Secretary of Samoan Affairs under Governor H. Rex Lee. A letter written by Paramount Chief Tuli Le'ato on September 7, 1962, to President Kennedy is on permanent display in the John F. Kennedy Presidential Library and Museum.

Immediately after Leiato's death, the Le'iato title was passed on to his son Tuli Tupua Le'iato.

The royal title Le'iato is second only to King (Tui) of Manuʻa of American Samoa.

Tuli Le'iato is the ancestor to many prominent Samoan figures including multimedia activist and award-winning filmmaker Queen Muhammad Ali, and Oregon Duck's Football Linebacker Fotu T. Leiato II.

References

American Samoan chiefs
1917 births
1983 deaths
American Samoan politicians